Hans Hach Verdugo and Adrián Menéndez Maceiras were the defending champions but only Hach Verdugo chose to defend his title, partnering Miguel Ángel Reyes-Varela. Hach Verdugo lost in the final to Malek Jaziri and Blaž Rola.

Jaziri and Rola won the title after defeating Hach Verdugo and Reyes-Varela 3–6, 6–3, [10–5] in the final.

Seeds

Draw

References

External links
 Main draw

Knoxville Challenger - Doubles
2021 Doubles